The 2021–22 season was the 122nd season in the existence of Futbol Club Barcelona and its 91st consecutive season in the top flight of Spanish football. In addition to the domestic league, Barcelona participated in this season's editions of the Copa del Rey, the Supercopa de España, the UEFA Champions League, and the UEFA Europa League, entering the latter competition for the first time since 2003–04. This was also the first season since 2003–04 and  1999–2000 in general not to feature Lionel Messi, who transferred to Paris Saint-Germain after his contract expired. This was the last full-season for Barcelona's defender Gerard Piqué, who retired before the winter World Cup. Piqué has spent 15 seasons with Barcelona and has won 30 official trophies with the club.

The season was a tumultuous one, as Barcelona's economic problems forced the departure of Messi and Griezmann, in addition to not being able to replace them with quality players. Barcelona finished third in their Champions League group and failed to reach the knockout stages for the first time since 2003, when it competed in the UEFA Cup after a disastrous domestic campaign the previous season. Furthermore, poor domestic form saw Barça drop as low as ninth in the league by late October, which triggered head coach Ronald Koeman's sacking. He was replaced by a club legend Xavi, who managed to reverse the team's fortunes with new winter signings Ferran Torres and Pierre-Emerick Aubameyang. The team's highlight of the season was the 4–0 thrashing of Real Madrid at the Bernabéu, which helped propel them to the second place in the standings, one they never relinquished for the rest of the campaign. However, April saw Barcelona get knocked out of the Europa League by Eintracht Frankfurt. Coupled with several league stumbles in April and May, in addition to earlier defeats in the Supercopa de España and Copa del Rey, Barça ended up trophyless, never managing to catch up with runaway leaders Real Madrid.

Kits
Supplier: Nike
Sponsor: Rakuten (front) / UNICEF (back)

Kit information
This was final season of Rakuten as Barcelona main sponsor shirt before replaced by Spotify next season.

Home: The home kit featured unusual design, instead of blue and red stripes, or halves, or any of the variations used in recent years, the new Barcelona home kit took the graphics from the club crest and applies to the entire front. The shorts were also very unusual, featuring half blue and half red sides together with two blue and red hoops socks. The home kit was used for La Liga and Copa del Rey matches.
Home (European): Barcelona also released the home kit for European matches. The kit features traditional Barcelona stripes with illustrations that highlighted landmarks of various Barcelona neighborhoods inside the stripes (these include, among others, the three chimneys of Poble Sec or the original La Masia, which is located next to the Camp Nou). The blue shorts and navy socks completed the set.
Away: The away kit was purple with a shiny iridescent logo and with the blue and red stripes on the sides, purple shorts with blue and red stripes and purple socks completing the set.
Third: Barcelona continued to use their 2019–20 Senyera fourth kit for the third season in a row. This time, it was featured on a more regular basis compared to the previous seasons, and in fact served as a third kit due to the absence of a new third kit with contrasting colors.

Season overview

May
On 31 May, Barcelona announced the signing of Sergio Agüero from Manchester City on a free transfer.

June
On 1 June, Barcelona announced the signing of Eric García from Manchester City on a free transfer.

On 2 June, Barcelona announced the signing of Emerson Royal from Real Betis. Barça had informed Betis that they would exercise their option to bring back Emerson after his two-year long loan spell with the Verdiblancos.

On 19 June, Barcelona announced the signing of Memphis Depay from Olympique Lyonnais on a free transfer.

On 27 June, OGC Nice activated their option to buy Jean-Clair Todibo permanently from his loan spell for €8.5 million plus €7 million in variables.

On 29 June, Barcelona and Olympique de Marseille reached an agreement for the transfer of Konrad de la Fuente for €3 million. Barça will also receive a percentage of any future transfer fee. Barça also terminated the contract of Matheus Fernandes.

July
On 1 July, Lionel Messi's contract expired amidst negotiations to sign a new contract, effectively making Messi a free agent.

On 4 July, Barcelona and Wolverhampton Wanderers reached an agreement for the loan of Francisco Trincão for the rest of the season with an option to buy for €29 million.

On 6 July, Barcelona and Leeds United reached an agreement for the transfer of Junior Firpo for a fee of €15 million.

On 7 July, UD Almería triggered Sergio Akieme's buy option for €3.5 million, with Barcelona reserving a right to 10% of any future sale and a right to first refusal.

On 9 July, Barcelona and SK Rapid Wien reached an agreement over the loan of Yusuf Demir, with Barça receiving an option to buy for €10 million.

On 10 July, Barcelona and Getafe reached an agreement for the transfer of Carles Aleñá.

On 17 July, Monchu joined Granada CF on a free deal following the expiration of his contract, with Barça reserving a right to 50% of any future sale, and a right to first refusal with a buyback option.

August
Despite reaching an agreement with Messi and having planned to sign a contract on 5 August, the club announced that Messi would not stay at the club due to financial and structural obstacles posed by La Liga regulations. He subsequently joined Paris Saint-Germain on 10 August.

On 15 August, Barcelona defeated Real Sociedad 4–2 at home. Goals from Gerard Piqué, Sergi Roberto and a brace from Martin Braithwaite ensured victory in their first La Liga match of the season.

On 21 August, Barcelona drew with Athletic Bilbao away at San Mamés in the second match of the season. Iñigo Martínez scored for Athletic Club, and Memphis Depay scored his first official goal for Barça to end the match 1–1.

On 29 August, Barcelona defeated Getafe 2–1 at home, thanks to goals from Sergi Roberto and Memphis Depay.

On 31 August, Barcelona reached an agreement with RB Leipzig for the transfer of Ilaix Moriba for €16 million with €6 million in add-ons; reached an agreement with Spezia for the loan of Rey Manaj for a fee of €300,000 with an option to buy for €2.7 million at the end of the season; reached an agreement with Tottenham Hotspur for the transfer of Emerson Royal for €25 million; and reached an agreement with Atlético Madrid for the loan of Antoine Griezmann for a reported fee of €10 million with a mandatory buy option of €40 million. Barça also announced the signing of Luuk de Jong from Sevilla on a season long loan with an option to buy.

September
On 2 September, Barcelona and Beşiktaş reached an agreement for the loan of Miralem Pjanić for the rest of the season.

On 14 September, Barcelona lost 3–0 at home to Bayern Munich in the first UEFA Champions League game of the season. Thomas Müller and Robert Lewandowski (brace) scored for the Bavarians.

On 20 September, Barcelona drew 1–1 with Granada at home. Barça conceded early in the match, but a goal from Ronald Araújo in the last minute of the game levelled the score.

On 23 September, Barcelona drew 0–0 with Cádiz away from home.

On 26 September, Barcelona defeated Levante 3–0 at home. Memphis, Luuk de Jong and Ansu Fati were the goalscorers, with the latter making his return after a 10-month absence due to injury. De Jong also scored his first goal for Barça.

On 29 September, Barcelona lost 3–0 against Benfica away from home on the second matchday of the Champions League.

October
On 2 October, Barcelona lost 2–0 against Atlético Madrid away from home. Thomas Lemar and former Barça player Luis Suárez scored the goals.

On 14 October, Barcelona and midfielder Pedri reached an agreement to extend the player's contract for a further four seasons through to 2026 with a release clause of €1 billion.

On 17 October, Barcelona defeated Valencia 3–1 at home. Valencia took the lead early in the match, but goals from Fati, Memphis and Philippe Coutinho ensured victory for Barça.

On 20 October, Barcelona defeated Dynamo Kyiv 1–0 at home in the Champions league. Piqué scored the only goal in the game. Later that day Barcelona announced that they had reached an agreement with Ansu Fati to extend the player's contract for a further five seasons through to 2027 with a release clause of €1 billion.

On 24 October, Barcelona were defeated in El Clásico 2–1 at home, with David Alaba and Lucas Vázquez scoring for Real Madrid. Sergio Agüero scored in the last minute for a late consolation.

On 27 October, Barcelona were again defeated, this time by Rayo Vallecano 1–0 away, with Radamel Falcao scoring the winner in the first half. It was Rayo's first league win over Barça in 19 years.

On 28 October, Barcelona announced the dismissal of Ronald Koeman as the first team coach, ending his spell at the club after 14 months.

On 29 October, Barcelona announced the appointment of Barcelona B head coach Sergi Barjuán as the interim manager of the first team.

On 30 October, Barcelona drew 1–1 with Deportivo Alavés at home. Memphis scored first for the Blaugrana, but Alavés equalised shortly after, courtesy of Luis Rioja.

November
On 2 November, Barcelona defeated Dynamo Kyiv 1–0 away from home in the Champions league. Ansu Fati scored the only goal in the game.

On 6 November, Barcelona announced the appointment of Xavi as the new first team head coach until 2024. Later that day, Barcelona drew 3–3 with Celta Vigo away from home. Barça had a three-goal lead within the first half with goals from Fati, Busquets and Memphis, but a spirited performance from Celta levelled the score in the second half with the equalising goal from Iago Aspas coming in the final minute.

On 12 November, Barcelona announced an agreement in principle to sign former right-back Dani Alves on a free transfer.

On 20 November, on Xavi's managerial debut, Barcelona defeated Espanyol 1–0 at home in the derbi barceloní. Memphis scored from the penalty spot.

On 23 November, Barcelona drew 0–0 with Benfica at home in the Champions League.

On 27 November, Barcelona defeated Villarreal 3–1 away from home. Frenkie de Jong scored first, but Samuel Chukwueze equalised for the Yellow Submarine. Memphis and Coutinho scored late to seal the win for Barça.

December
On 4 December, Barcelona lost to Real Betis 1–0 at home. Juanmi scored for the visitors.

On 8 December, Barcelona lost to Bayern 3–0 away from home at an empty Allianz Arena. Müller, Leroy Sané and Jamal Musiala scored for the home side, eliminating Barça from the group stage and making the Blaugrana play in the UEFA Europa League for the first time since 2003.

On 9 December, Barcelona and Granada reached an agreement for the loan of Álex Collado until the end of the season.

On 12 December, Barcelona drew 2–2 with Osasuna away from home. Nico and Abde scored for Barca.

On 15 December, Sergio Agüero announced his retirement in a press conference at the Camp Nou.

On 18 December, Barcelona defeated Elche 3–2 at home. Goals from Ferran Jutglà and Gavi gave an early two goal lead for Barça, But two goals scored by Elche in two minutes made the score level. Nico scored in the late stages of the game to earn victory for Barça.

On 21 December, Barcelona drew 1–1 with Sevilla at the Ramón Sánchez Pizjuán, with Papu Gómez opening the account for Los Rojiblancos and Araújo equalising in the dying moments of the first–half.

On 28 December, Barcelona announced the signing of Ferran Torres, with Torres signing a 5-year contract until 2027, with a buyout clause of €1 billion.

January
On 2 January, Barcelona defeated Real Mallorca 1–0 at the Visit Mallorca Stadium. Luuk de Jong scored the only goal.

On 5 January, Barcelona started their Copa del Rey campaign with a 2–1 away win against Linares.

On 7 January, Barcelona reached an agreement with Aston Villa for the loan of Philippe Coutinho until the end of the season.

On 8 January, Barcelona drew 1–1 with Granada away from home. Luuk de Jong took the lead for Barcelona but Granada equalised at the closing stages of the game.

On 10 January, Samuel Umtiti extended his contract until 2026, which allowed Barcelona to register Ferran Torres.

On 12 January, the second Clásico of the season was contested, this time at the semi-final stage of the Supercopa de España. Luuk de Jong and Ansu Fati scored equalisers for Barça, but it was not enough as Madrid won 3–2 after extra time.

On 13 January, Barcelona reached an agreement with Rapid Wien to end the loan of Yusuf Demir.

On 20 January, Barcelona were knocked out of the Copa del Rey round of 16 by Athletic Bilbao 3–2 at San Mamés, with Iker Muniain's late winner cancelling out Ferran Torres and Pedri's goals, with the former scoring his first Barça goal.

On 23 January, Barcelona defeated Deportivo Alavés 1–0 away, thanks to a late winner from Frenkie de Jong.

On 29 January, Barcelona announced the signing of Adama Traoré on loan from Wolverhampton Wanderers.

February
On 5 February, Barcelona announced the signing of Pierre-Emerick Aubameyang for free after his contract with Arsenal was terminated.

On 6 February, Barcelona defeated Atletico Madrid 4–2 at home. Atletico took an early lead but goals from Jordi Alba, Gavi, Araújo and Dani Alves provided a convincing victory for Barça.

On 13 February, Barcelona drew 2–2 with Espanyol away from home. Pedri scored an early goal to give lead for Barça, but two goals from the home side almost made them win the match before a late goal from Luuk de Jong which earned a point for Barcelona.

On 17 February, Barcelona opened their Europa league campaign with a 1–1 draw with Napoli at home in the first leg of the round of 32. Napoli scored first and Ferran Torres converted a penalty to level the score.

On 20 February, Barcelona defeated Valencia 4–1 away from home. A goal from Frenkie de Jong  and a hat-trick from Aubameyang gained victory over Los Che.

On 24 February, Barcelona defeated Napoli 4–2 away from home in the second leg of the Europa League round of 32. Jordi Alba, Frenkie de Jong, Pique and Aubameyang scored for Barça.

On 27 February, Barcelona defeated Athletic Bilbao 4–0 at home. Aubameyang, Dembélé, Luuk de Jong and Memphis Depay scored for Barcelona to secure three points.

March
On 6 March, Barcelona defeated Elche 2–1 away from home. Elche scored late in the first half, but goals from Torres and Depay turned the game in favour of Barcelona.

On 10 March, Barcelona drew 0–0 with Galatasaray at home in the first leg of the Europa League round of 16.

On 13 March, Barcelona defeated Osasuna 4–0 at home. Ferran Torres scored a brace while Aubameyang and Riqui Puig added a goal each.

On 17 March, Barcelona defeated Galatasaray 2–1 away from home in the second leg of the Europa League round of 16. Galatasaray scored the first goal of the match but goals from Pedri and Aubameyang cancelled out their lead and secured 2–1 aggregate victory for Barça.

On 20 March, in the third Clásico of the season, Barcelona defeated Real Madrid 4–0 away from home. A brace from Aubameyang and goals from Araújo and Torres secured a crushing victory at the Bernabeu.

April
On 3 April, Barcelona defeated Sevilla 1–0 at home. Pedri scored the only goal of the match. With this win, Barça climes up to second in the league standings.

On 7 April, Barcelona drew 1–1 with Eintracht Frankfurt away from home in the first leg of the Europa League quarter-finals. Ferran Torres scored for Barcelona.

On 10 April, Barcelona defeated Levante 3–2 away from home. Aubameyang and Pedri scored for Barça while having conceded two penalties. Luuk de Jong scored a late goal to earn the victory for Barcelona.

On 14 April, Barcelona lost to Eintracht Frankfurt 3–2 at home in the second leg of the Europa League quarter-finals. Frankfurt dominated the game having a three-goal lead until the end of the regulation time. Barcelona's goals came in the stoppage time with Busquets scoring and Depay converting a penalty. With an aggregate score of 4–3, Barcelona were eliminated from the Europa League.

On 18 April, Barcelona lost to Cádiz 1–0 at home.

On 21 April, Barcelona defeated Real Sociedad 1–0 away from home. Aubameyang scored the only goal in the first half of the match.

On 24 April, Barcelona lost to Rayo Vallecano 1–0 at home.

On 26 April, Barcelona and defender Ronald Araújo reached an agreement to extend the player's contract through to 2026 with a release clause of €1 billion.

May
On 1 May, Barcelona defeated Real Mallorca 2–1 at home. Memphis Depay and Sergio Busquets scored for Barça.

On 7 May, Barcelona defeated Real Betis 2–1 away from home. Ansu Fati scored while former Barça player Marc Bartra scored the equaliser for Betis. Jordi Alba scored in the final minutes of the match to earn the victory.

On 10 May, Barcelona defeated Celta Vigo 3–1 at home. Memphis scored a goal while Aubameyang added a brace.

On 12 May, Aston Villa triggered Philippe Coutinho's option to buy for a fee of €20 million with Barça receiving a 50% sell-on percentage.

On 15 May, Barcelona drew 0–0 with Getafe away from home.

On 22 May, Barcelona lost to Villarreal 2–0 at home in the last game of the season. Barcelona finished their league campaign in the second position, qualifying for the next season's Supercopa de España and UEFA Champions League.

Players

First team

From Barcelona B and Youth Academy

Transfers

In

Out

Loans in

Loans out

Transfer summary
Undisclosed fees are not included in the transfer totals.

Expenditure

Summer:  €10,500,000

Winter:  €55,000,000

Total:  €65,500,000

Income

Summer:  €95,800,000

Winter:  €0,000,000

Total:  €95,800,000

Net totals

Summer:  €85,300,000

Winter:  €55,000,000

Total:  €30,300,000

Pre-season and friendlies

Competitions

Overall record

La Liga

League table

Results summary

Results by round

Matches
The league fixtures were announced on 30 June 2021.

Copa del Rey

Supercopa de España

UEFA Champions League

Group stage

The draw for the group stage was held on 26 August 2021.

UEFA Europa League

Knockout phase

Knockout round play-offs
The draw for the knockout round play-offs was held on 13 December 2021.

Round of 16
The draw for the Round of 16 was held on 25 February 2022.

Quarter-finals
The draw for the quarter-finals was held on 18 March 2022.

Statistics

Squad statistics

|-
!colspan=16 style="background:#26559B; color:#FFF000; "|Goalkeepers

|-
!colspan=16 style="background:#26559B; color:#FFF000; "|Defenders

|-
!colspan=16 style="background:#26559B; color:#FFF000; "|Midfielders

|-
!colspan=16 style="background:#26559B; color:#FFF000; "|Forwards

|-
! colspan=16 style=background:#dcdcdc; text-align:center| Players who have made an appearance or had a squad number this season but have left the club

|}

Goalscorers

Hat-tricks

(H) – Home; (A) – Away

Disciplinary record

Injury record

Notes

References

FC Barcelona seasons
Barcelona
Barcelona
Barcelona
Barcelona